The 2015 Louisiana–Lafayette Ragin' Cajuns softball team represented the University of Louisiana at Lafayette in the 2015 NCAA Division I softball season. The Ragin' Cajuns played their home games at Lamson Park and were led by fifteenth year head coach Michael Lotief.

Preseason

Sun Belt Conference Coaches Poll
The Sun Belt Conference Coaches Poll was released on January 28, 2015. Louisiana-Lafayette was picked to finish first in the Sun Belt Conference with 79 votes and 7 first place votes.

Preseason All-Sun Belt team
Christina Hamilton (ULL, SR, Pitcher)
Farish Beard (USA, SR, Pitcher)
Lexie Elkins (ULL, JR, Catcher)
Lauren Coleman (GSU, SR, 1st Base)
Miyuki Navarrete (ULM, SR, 2nd Base)
Taylor Anderson (GSU, JR, Shortstop)
Courtney Harris (TXST, SR, 3rd Base)
Rochelle Roberts (ULM, SO, Outfield)
Blair Johnson (USA, SR, Outfield)
Stephanie Pilkington (USA, JR, Outfield)
Kortney Koroll (TXST, SR, Designated Player)
Taylor Rogers (GASO, SO, At-Large)
Haley Hayden (ULL, SO, At-Large)
Shellie Landry (ULL, JR, At-Large)
Alexis Cacioppo (ULM, SR, At-Large)

Sun Belt Preseason Player of the Year
Lexie Elkins (ULL, JR, Catcher)

Sun Belt Preseason Pitcher of the Year
Christina Hamilton (ULL, SR, Pitcher)

Roster

Coaching staff

Schedule and results

Lafayette Regional

Auburn Super Regional

References

Louisiana
Louisiana Ragin' Cajuns softball seasons
Louisiana softball
Louisiana
Louisiana softball